Silvia Bonastre Peremateu (born 29 November 1981 in Terrassa, Catalonia) is a field hockey midfield player from Spain, who represented her native country at the 2004 Summer Olympics in Athens, Greece and at the 2008 Summer Olympics in Beijing. She was also a member of the Spain national team that finished fourth at the 2006 Women's Hockey World Cup in Madrid, under the guidance of head coach Pablo Usoz. Her sister, Berta Bonastre, still plays for the National Team.

References
 Spanish Olympic Committee

External links
 

1981 births
Living people
Spanish female field hockey players
Field hockey players from Catalonia
Olympic field hockey players of Spain
Field hockey players at the 2004 Summer Olympics
Field hockey players at the 2008 Summer Olympics
Atlètic Terrassa players
Sportspeople from Terrassa